Alberta Provincial Highway No. 873, commonly referred to as Highway 873, is a highway in southern Alberta, Canada.  It generally runs north-south from Range Road 162 near the Hamlet of Rainier, through the City of Brooks to Highway 550 in Village of Duchess.

Route description 
It travels east to the intersection of Highway 36 where it becomes a gravel highway and continues east along the south end of Lake Newell to Highway 535, where it turns north and continues towards Kinbrook Island Provincial Park, where at the park entrance it once again becomes a paved highway. Highway 873 continues north where it enters Brooks along 7 Street E where it follows a series of city streets, a short concurrency with Highway 542, and leaves Brooks along 2 Street W, the city's main commercial strip. It crosses the Trans-Canada Highway (Highway 1) at the city's northern boundary and continues north past Highway 544 to Duchess where it ends at the intersection of Highway 550. The roadway continues north as Range Road 144.

History 
The section of Highway 873 between Brooks and Duchess has had multiple designations in its history.  Along with Highway 550, the route was originally designated as part of Highway 2, which at the time was an east-west inter-provincial highway that ran through Calgary and Medicine Hat (the present-day Highway 2 was designated as Highway 1).  In 1941, Highway 2 was renumbered to Highway 1 to allow for continual numbering through Western Canada along the future Trans-Canada Highway, which was commissioned in 1949.  In the mid-1950s, the Trans-Canada Highway was realigned between Brooks and Bassano, resulting in the Duchess-Bassano section being decommissioned and the Brooks-Duchess section becoming part of Highway 36.  In the 1970s, Highway 36 north was realigned to align with the Highway 1/36 (south) junction located west of Brooks, resulting in the Brooks-Duchess section becoming Highway 873.

Major intersections 
From south to north:

References 

873
Former segments of the Trans-Canada Highway